"My Boo" (sometimes subtitled as "The Things You Do") is a song by the musician CeCe Peniston, which was released on the Steve Hurley's own record label
in February 2001 as the singer's last single issued under the producer's Silk Entertainment label.

The single release followed the US Dance success of the Peniston's number two hit Lifetime to Love, her first Top 3 entry in the Billboard Hot Dance Music/Club Play
since 1995. Six months later, a remixed four track alternation of "My Boo" that featured also mixes from Ron Carroll would follow in August. But due to its exclusive release on vinyl,
and non-availability either on various artists CD music compilations, the title became a very hard-to-find item at least in a digital format.

The song contained a sample of "The Bottle" by Gil Scott-Heron, one of the most important progenitors of rap music (at that time imprisoned for one
to three years following series of drug possession charges as well as his failure to deal with persistent drugs problems, which scored at number fifteen on the US R&B chart.

Credits and personnel
 CeCe Peniston – lead/back vocal, writer
 Steve Hurley – writer, remix, producer
 Ron Carroll –  remix
 DJ Anderson Soares – mix
 Silktone Songs Inc. (ASCAP) – publisher
 Brouhaha Music, – admin by TVT Music Inc.
 Contains a sample of "The Bottle" by Gil Scott-Heron

Track listings and formats

 12", US, #SENT 0006-1
 "My Boo (The Things You Do)" (12" Version)
 "My Boo (The Things You Do)" (Acapella)
 "My Boo (The Things You Do)" (Disco Dub)
 "My Boo (The Things You Do)" (Demo Version)

 12", US, #SENT 0009
 "My Boo" (Ron Carroll's Body Music Vocal Mix)
 "My Boo" (Silk's Deep House Dub)
 "My Boo" (Silk's Deep House Mix)
 "My Boo" (Ron's Instrumental Edit)

References

General

 Specific

External links 
 

2001 singles
CeCe Peniston songs
Songs written by Steve "Silk" Hurley
Songs written by CeCe Peniston
2000 songs